Velimir Crljen (born 23 July 1966) is a Croatian retired footballer and manager who played in the Croatian First Football League, American Professional Soccer League, Canadian Professional Soccer League, and S.League. He also had several notable terms as a manager for Toronto Croatia in the CPSL/CSL.

Playing career 
Crljen played with HNK Šibenik of the Croatian First Football League in 1992. In 1993, he played abroad in the Canadian National Soccer League with Toronto Croatia. The following season played in the American Professional Soccer League with the Toronto Rockets. He made his debut on 8 July 1994 against Seattle Sounders. In 1996, he played in the newly formed S.League with the Singapore Armed Forces FC, where he formed an instrumental triumvirate with fellow Croatian imports Ivica Raguz, and Jure Ere. During his tenure with SAFFC he won the three league titles, Singapore Cup, and the Singapore FA Cup.

In 2000, he returned to Canada in the role of player/coach for Toronto Croatia in the Canadian Professional Soccer League. Crljen managed to achieve a CPSL Championship after defeating the Toronto Olympians. After a one year absence he returned to Singapore to sign with Jurong FC. In 2002, he permanently returned to Toronto Croatia, where he would eventually make the full transition from a player to a manager. He won his second CPSL Championship as a player in 2004.

Managerial career 
In 2003, he resumed his dual role of player/coach for Toronto. After a year sabbatical from coaching, he returned to manage in 2005 and was named the head coach for the 2006 CSL All-Star team. In 2009, he fully retired from competitive soccer and returned to managing Toronto Croatia, where he was dismissed at the conclusion of the season. He returned in 2011 to lead Croatia to a championship, and followed by a double in 2012. In 2012, he was recognized by the league with the Coach of the Year award. He added another championship title in 2015, making Crljen one of the most successful managers in CPSL/CSL history.

Honours

Player
 Singapore Armed Forces FC 
 S.League (2): 1997, 1998 
 Singapore FA Cup (1): 1997
 Singapore Cup (1): 1999
 Toronto Croatia 
 CPSL Championship (2): 2000, 2004

Managerial
 Toronto Croatia  
 CSL Championship (3): 2011, 2012, 2015
 Canadian Soccer League Regular Season Champions (1): 2012

References 

1966 births
Living people
Association football midfielders
Croatian footballers
HNK Šibenik players
Toronto Croatia players
Toronto Rockets players
Warriors FC players
Jurong FC players
Croatian Football League players
American Professional Soccer League players
Canadian National Soccer League players
Canadian Soccer League (1998–present) players
Singapore Premier League players
Croatian expatriate footballers
Expatriate soccer players in Canada
Croatian expatriate sportspeople in Canada
Expatriate footballers in Singapore
Croatian expatriate sportspeople in Singapore
Croatian football managers
Toronto Croatia managers
Canadian Soccer League (1998–present) managers
Croatian expatriate football managers
Expatriate soccer managers in Canada